Dunn Field is a stadium in Elmira, New York primarily used for baseball. Located on the banks of the Chemung River at the end of Luce St, it has been the home of various incarnations of the Elmira Pioneers since its opening in 1939.

History
The first stadium at the site was known as the Maple Avenue Driving Park. On Friday, November 21, 1902, the stadium was the site of the first ever professional football night game. The Philadelphia Athletics football team, of the first National Football League, defeated the Kanaweola Athletic Club, 39–0. The stadium also served as an alternate home for baseball's National League Buffalo Bisons in the late 19th century.

The Maple Avenue Driving Park was replaced by Recreation Park, which burned down in 1938. A new stadium built to replace it was named after a local businessman, Edward Joseph Dunn, who donated some land for the stadium to the city.

Besides being the home field of the Elmira Pioneers baseball team, a variety of events have taken place in the stadium over the years, such as wrestling and boxing matches, high school sports, and music concerts (The Beach Boys played there in 1984).

Dunn Field served as the home field for both Elmira Free Academy and Southside High School football teams for many years until each team built their own stadiums.  The Erie Bell game was often a special occasion at Dunn Field, since both Elmira Free Academy and Southside High School played their home games at Dunn Field.

Many great baseball players played their home games on this field during part of their minor league years, including Wade Boggs, Curt Schilling, and Jim Palmer. Former player and MLB manager Don Zimmer was even married on Dunn Field in 1951 (pictured in Sports Illustrated magazine, and his autobiography).

Stadium Operations Staff

Renovations 2012

What was supposed to be $12,000 quickly climbed to almost $40,000 in renovations. The work is being paid for by the City of Elmira, owner of the 73 year old stadium, and will go from the entrance way all the way to some of the seating being done and repainted. Bathrooms without tile will be a thing of the past. Most notable is a section of stadium seating ripped out.
Robbie Nichols is the new co-owner of the Elmira Pioneers, along with his wife Nellie Franco-Nichols. Workers are now working to fill in that hole with new steel. Other sections of the stadium will also need the same repair.

While fans also enjoy a new beer garden just behind 3rd base, with live entertainment during games, the players won't be forgotten. "There were posters hanging in the locker room. You take down a poster and there was either a bat hole or ball hole. We put 10 new sheets of sheet rock up,″ Lewis said. The new locker room and other events are in hopes Dunn Field will return to its once famed reputation for Elmira.

"We want to open it the right way. Have a great impact to the city,” Lewis said.

The Numbers

Dunn Field has a capacity of 4,020 people, including 312 box seats. Its field dimensions are:

 Left - 325'
 Left Center - 358'
 Center - 386'
 Right Center - 358'
 Right - 325'
 Fences are 12' high (20' in LF).

References

External links
 Dunn Field
 Dunn Field Review by Small-Parks.com 
 Photographs of Dunn Field - Rochester Area Ballparks
Dunn Field Municipal Stadium Views – Ball Parks of the Minor Leagues
 Edward Joseph Dunn -- The History of New York State Biographies, Editor, Dr. James Sullivan

Sports venues in Chemung County, New York
Minor league baseball venues
Baseball venues in New York (state)
Buildings and structures in Elmira, New York
1939 establishments in New York (state)
Sports venues completed in 1939
College baseball venues in the United States
High school baseball venues in the United States
High school football venues in the United States
American football venues in New York (state)